Hatidža Hadžiosmanović (19 August 1938 – 23 December 2015) was a Bosnian judge, member and president of the Constitutional Court of Bosnia and Herzegovina.

Biography 
Born in Sarajevo, Hadžiosmanović graduated from the Sarajevo Law School on 30 June 1962. She passed the bar exam in 1967 with excellent results. In 1957–67 she headed the legal office of the Sarajevo Tobacco Factory.

Thereafter and until 2002 she held office as a judge of various regular courts: Municipal Court I Sarajevo (1967–71); District Court of Sarajevo (currently Cantonal Court of Sarajevo) (1972–88); the Supreme Court of the Socialist Republic of Bosnia and Herzegovina from 1988 to 1992; the Supreme Court of the Republic of Bosnia and Herzegovina in 1992–1995, and then the Supreme Court of the Federation of Bosnia and Herzegovina. On 30 June 2002, she was appointed by the Federation entity parliament as judge of the Constitutional Court of Bosnia and Herzegovina. In June 2006 she was appointed President of the Constitutional Court of Bosnia and Herzegovina. She retired at age 70 in 2008.

Hadžiosmanović-Mahić dedicated her entire professional career to the law and its theoretical and practical application in economy as well as dealing with first-instance, second-instance, appellate, cassation and constitutional judicature. She died on 23 December 2015, aged 77.

References

External links
Constitutional Court of Bosnia and Herzegovina

1938 births
2015 deaths
Bosnia and Herzegovina judges
Law of Bosnia and Herzegovina
Constitutional court women judges
Judges of the Constitutional Court of Bosnia and Herzegovina
Presidents of the Constitutional Court of Bosnia and Herzegovina
People from Sarajevo
Sarajevo Law School alumni
Yugoslav judges
Place of death missing